The 1982 Volta a Catalunya was the 62nd edition of the Volta a Catalunya cycle race and was held from 8 September to 15 September 1982. The race started in Platja d'Aro and finished at Salou. The race was won by Alberto Fernández of the Teka team.

General classification

References

1982
Volta
1982 in Spanish road cycling
September 1982 sports events in Europe